The Sony DCR-TRV900 was a DV tape camcorder released by Sony in 1998, with an MSRP of USD $2699. It was intended as a high-end consumer camera, more portable and less expensive than the top-of-the-line DCR-VX1000. In 2002, Sony replaced the TRV900 with the somewhat less well-received DCR-TRV950.

The camcorder had three 1/4-inch CCDs, which provided an exceptionally high-quality video image for a handheld camcorder of the period. It also had a 3.5-inch LCD screen, a color viewfinder, a 12x optical zoom, a 48x digital zoom, and a manual focus ring. The camcorder included a FireWire port for transferring video to a computer.

At the time, Sony had a pattern of releasing "professional" upgraded versions of their most popular consumer cameras, with the same chassis shape but made from more durable materials and in a darker color. Extra features included XLR inputs and the ability to record in the higher-grade DVCAM format. The TRV900's pro equivalent was the DSR-PD100, released in 2000; the TRV950's was the DSR-PDX10.

Specs

TRV900 vs. TRV950

There are several differences between the two.

Chip Size

The TRV900 has 1/4' chips and the TRV950 has 1/4.7.

CCD Pixels

The TRV950 has substantially smaller CCD Pixels than the 900 with 380k pixels while the 950 has 690k.

LCD Monitor

Both have a 3.5" LCD Monitor.

Zoom

The only difference in zoom between the two is that the 900's digital zoom is 48x while the digital zoom for the TRV950 is 150x. Also the TRV950s zoom rocker is more sensitive.

Low Light

The TRV900 Low Light Rating is 4 lux while the TRV950 is 7 lux.

Progressive Mode

Although progressive mode on the TRV900 has a slow frame rate, the 950 has no explicit progressive mode. Running the "flash" digital effect at the lowest possible setting will simulate a progressive mode.

Audio

The TRV950 has a little more "hiss" than the TRV900. Also, the internal speaker of the TRV950 is smaller than the TRV900 and has less output.

A/D conversion and pass-through

The TRV950 has a fully functional analog to digital conversion and pass-through unlike the TRV900. The TRV900 will allow you to record from an analog source but will not directly convert the analog signal into DV when connected to a firewire port.

References
 Using the Sony DCR-TRV900 Camcorder (Full Review)
 TRV900 FAQ

DCR-TRV900
DCR-TRV900